Liar's Dice is a board game published in 1987 by Milton Bradley.

Contents
Liar's Dice is a game in which each player shakes five dice inside a shaker, and the first player makes a bid on the hidden results, and the other players in order must raise the bid or challenge.

Reception
The Chicago Tribune called the game "A nice combination of strategy and luck; good for the whole family."

Brian Walker reviewed Liar's Dice for Games International magazine, and gave it 5 stars out of 5, and stated that "Role-players, wargamers (even), and people who normally hate games can play, enjoy, and win this game. Liar's Dice, entry in the hall of fame is yours, no die roll required."

Reviews
Games

References

Board games introduced in 1987